William Richard Charles Blundell  (April 13, 1927 – March 10, 2023) was a Canadian businessman.

Born in Montreal, Quebec, he received a B.A.Sc. in 1949 from the University of Toronto. He joined General Electric Canada in 1949 eventually becoming chairman and chief executive officer from 1985 to 1990. He retired from GE Canada in 1991.

Blundell was appointed to the board of directors of Manulife Financial in 1991. He was the interim President and chief executive officer from 1993 to 1994. From 1994 to 1998, he was chairman of the board. In 2001, he was appointed interim President and CEO of Alcan Aluminium Limited.

In 1997, he was made an Officer of the Order of Canada.

Blundell died on March 10, 2023, at the age of 95.

References

1927 births
2023 deaths
Businesspeople from Montreal
Officers of the Order of Canada
University of Toronto alumni